Sati Pradha Mela or (pattharon ka mela) is an annual event held in Dhami, North India. It is said to mark the death of local queen Sati, who died in 1904. At the celebration, people gather to be divided in two groups which much engage each other in a stone throwing battle. The battle traditionally goes on for several hours. The group with the fewest wounded members will be declared winner of the event.

Local police and doctors are available at the event to treat the injuries.

External links
 "Stone pelting fair an annual event", The Tribune, 8 October 2003

Festivals in Himachal Pradesh
Fairs in India